Margaret Jepkoech Kamar (born 28 April 1959) is a Kenyan politician and the deputy speaker of the Senate. She is the first elected female Deputy Speaker in the history of the Kenyan Senate.She belongs to the Jubilee Alliance Party. She was first elected to represent the Uasin Gishu County in the Senate of Kenya since 2017 after the 2017 Kenyan parliamentary election.

Biography
Kamar was born on 28 April 1959 in Keiyo, Kenya. She obtained a BSc. Hon. in Agriculture in Soil and Water Conservation. She later obtained a Med Soil Science from McGill University in 1986 and a Ph.D. in Soil and Water Conservation from the Faculty of Forestry and Conservation of the University of Toronto.

In 1988, she served as Soils Consultant at UNEP during the development of the Desertification Map. She became a professor in Soil Science at Moi University in 1999 and held various positions at the university.

From 1999 to 2006, she was a member of the East African Legislative Assembly and chaired the Environment, Natural Resources, Agriculture and Tourism committee. She also led the delegation to the World Summit on Sustainable Development (WSSD) to South Africa in 2002.

Between 2008 and 2010, she was the delegation leader to the African, Caribbean and Pacific and European Union Joint Parliamentary Assembly (ACP-EU JPA). She also served as the Assistant Minister Environment and Mineral Resources from 2010 to 2011 and Minister of Higher Education, Science and Technology from 2011 to 2013.

In 2013, she became the director at the International Centre for Research in Sustainable Development, a non-governmental organisation.

References

Living people
1959 births
Orange Democratic Movement politicians
Members of the National Assembly (Kenya)
Members of the East African Legislative Assembly
Government ministers of Kenya
Women government ministers of Kenya
Higher education ministers
21st-century Kenyan women politicians
21st-century Kenyan politicians
McGill University Faculty of Agricultural and Environmental Sciences alumni
University of Toronto alumni
Academic staff of Moi University
Members of the 11th Parliament of Kenya